David J. Sappelt (born January 2, 1987) is a former professional baseball outfielder. He played in Major League Baseball (MLB) for the Cincinnati Reds and Chicago Cubs. On June 9, 2015, the Boston Red Sox signed Dave to a Minor League contract. He bats and throws right handed. He graduated from Southern Alamance High School in Burlington, NC. Sappelt played college baseball at Coastal Carolina University. He resides in Graham, NC.

Professional Baseball

Cincinnati Reds
The Cincinnati Reds drafted him in the 9th round of the 2008 Major League Baseball Draft.

He played 2008 for the rookie class Billings Mustangs. He hit .299 with 7 homers and 35 RBI in 254 at-bats. Sappelt had 301 at-bats for Single-A Dayton in 2009, hitting .269 with 3 homers and 25 RBI; in 251 at-bats for the single-A advanced Sarasota Reds he hit .295 with 4 homers and 21 RBI.

Sappelt started 2010 with the Single-A advanced Lynchburg Hillcats. He hit .282 with 0 homers and 4 RBI in 71 at-bats. He was promoted to Double-A Carolina, and hit .361 with 9 homers and 62 RBI in 330 at-bats. He was a mid- and post-season All-Star in the Southern League for the Mudcats, and was named Southern League Most Valuable Player. His performance earned him a promotion to Triple-A Louisville, where he hit .324 with 1 homer and 8 RBI in 108 at-bats for the Bats. His season totals for 2010 were 509 at-bats, .342 average, 10 homers, and 74 RBI. He was named Reds Minor League Hitter of the Year. His season performance earned him a trip to the prestigious Arizona Fall League, where he hit .292 in 72 at-bats with 0 homers and 10 RBI. He also played in the Venezuelan Winter League, batting .305 with 1 homer and 10 RBI in 118 at-bats. He received a non-roster invitation to spring training for 2011.

Sappelt was invited to the major league spring training camp in 2011 as a non-roster invitee. He backed up his award as Reds Minor League Hitter of the Year by hitting .564 (22-for-38), along with three homers and 12 RBI. However, Sappelt was cut from the Reds roster late in spring. Manager Dusty Baker said that a lot of the decision had to do with the fact that Sappelt was not on the 40-man roster, which at the time was full.

Sappelt went back to Louisville for the 2011 season, and continued hitting. Through his first 74 games as the Bats' center fielder, he hit .313 with seven homers and 29 RBI, including a .358 average against lefties.

After Chris Heisey injured his oblique in batting practice and was placed on the 15-day DL, Sappelt was called up to the majors for the first time on August 7, 2011. He made his Major League Debut vs the Chicago Cubs, leading off and playing left field.

Chicago Cubs

On December 23, 2011, Sappelt was traded with Travis Wood and Ronald Torreyes to the Chicago Cubs for Sean Marshall. On May 6, 2013, Sappelt was optioned to the Iowa Cubs. He was designated for assignment on September 3, 2013.

Philadelphia Phillies
On December 18, 2013, the Philadelphia Phillies signed Sappelt to a minor league contract, that included a spring training invitation.

Boston Red Sox
On June 9, 2015, Sappelt signed a minor league contract with the Boston Red Sox. He elected free agency on November 6, 2015.

Mexican League (2014-2017)
Sappelt played in the Mexican League for the Acereros de Monclova and Rojos del Águila de Veracruz in 2014, the Piratas de Campeche in 2015 and 2016, the Sultanes de Monterrey in 2016, and the Olmecas de Tabasco and Rieleros de Aguascalientes in 2017. He has also played in the Mexican Pacific League for the Águilas de Mexicali and the Yaquis de Obregón.

Southern Maryland Blue Crabs
On May 27, 2018, Sappelt signed with the Southern Maryland Blue Crabs of the Atlantic League of Professional Baseball. He was released on June 7, 2018.

Winnipeg Goldeyes
On June 13, 2018, Sappelt signed with the Winnipeg Goldeyes of the American Association.

Tigres de Quintana Roo
On July 15, 2018, Sappelt signed with the Tigres de Quintana Roo of the Mexican Baseball League. He was released on July 30, 2018.

References

External links

1987 births
Living people
Acereros de Monclova players
African-American baseball players
Águilas de Mexicali players
American expatriate baseball players in Canada
American expatriate baseball players in Mexico
Billings Mustangs players
Bravos de Margarita players
American expatriate baseball players in Venezuela
Caribes de Anzoátegui players
Carolina Mudcats players
Chicago Cubs players
Cincinnati Reds players
Coastal Carolina Chanticleers baseball players
Dayton Dragons players
Iowa Cubs players
Louisville Bats players
Lynchburg Hillcats players
Major League Baseball outfielders
Mexican League baseball outfielders
Olmecas de Tabasco players
People from Graham, North Carolina
Peoria Saguaros players
Piratas de Campeche players
Portland Sea Dogs players
Rieleros de Aguascalientes players
Rojos del Águila de Veracruz players
Sarasota Reds players
Southern Maryland Blue Crabs players
Tigres de Quintana Roo players
Winnipeg Goldeyes players
21st-century African-American sportspeople
20th-century African-American people